Gloucester City Water Works Engine House is located in Gloucester City, Camden County, New Jersey, United States. The building was built in 1883 and was added to the National Register of Historic Places on March 30, 1998.

See also
National Register of Historic Places listings in Camden County, New Jersey

References

Engine houses
Industrial buildings and structures on the National Register of Historic Places in New Jersey
Transportation buildings and structures in Camden County, New Jersey
Commercial buildings completed in 1883
National Register of Historic Places in Camden County, New Jersey
New Jersey Register of Historic Places
Gloucester City, New Jersey